Maksym Ruslanovych Andrushchenko (born 5 April 1999) is a Ukrainian professional footballer who plays as a left winger for Ukrainian club Polissya Zhytomyr.

References

External links
 Profile on Polissya Zhytomyr official website
 

1999 births
Living people
Footballers from Zhytomyr
Ukrainian footballers
Association football forwards
FC Shakhtar Donetsk players
FK Smederevo players
FK Spartak Subotica players
FK Dubočica players
FC Polissya Zhytomyr players
Ukrainian First League players
Serbian First League players
Ukrainian expatriate sportspeople in Serbia
Ukrainian expatriate footballers
Expatriate footballers in Serbia